Airline booking ploys are used by travelers in commercial aviation to lower the price of flying by circumventing airlines' rules about how tickets may be used. They are generally a breach of the contract of carriage between the passenger and the airline, which airlines may try to enforce in various ways.

Throwaway ticketing
Throwaway ticketing is purchasing a ticket with the intent to use only a portion of the included travel. This situation may arise when a passenger wants to travel only one way, but where the discounted round-trip excursion fare is cheaper than a one-way ticket. This can happen on mainline carriers where all one-way tickets are full price. For instance, a passenger intending to fly only from Los Angeles to New York may find the one-way ticket costs $800, but that the round-trip fare is $500. The passenger, therefore, purchases the round trip from Los Angeles to New York and back to Los Angeles and boards the flight to New York but stays in New York and "throws away" the second half of the ticket by not showing up for the return flight. It is possible to "throw away" only the final segments of a ticket because throwing away a segment by not showing up for the outbound trip often leads to the airline's canceling the entire reservation.

Hidden-city ticketing
Hidden-city ticketing or skiplagging is a variant of throwaway ticketing. The passenger books a ticket to a destination that they have no plans on traveling to, with a connection at the intended destination (the "hidden" city), walks away at the connection node, and discards the remaining segment. Flight fares are subject to market forces and so do not necessarily correlate to the distance flown. As a result, a flight between point A and point C, with a connection node at point B, might be cheaper than a flight between point A and point B. It is then possible to purchase an airline ticket from point A to point C, disembark at the connection node (B), and discard the remaining segment (B to C).

Using the hidden-city tactic is usually practical only for one-way trips, as airlines cancel the subsequent parts of the trip once a traveler has disembarked. Thus, round-trip itineraries need to be created by piecing two one-way flights together. This tactic also requires that the traveler have carry-on luggage only, as any checked baggage items will be unloaded only at the flight's ticketed final destination. Exceptions to this requirement only occur when re-entering a country where luggage must be processed by customs agents, when changing airports, or when train travel is involved in the flight ticket. This allows a traveler to reclaim their luggage before checking in for their final destination, and simply leave the airport.  Hidden-city ticketing carries the risk of the initial flight being overbooked or cancelled, and the airline transferring the passenger to a different route that bypasses the connection node.

Hidden-city ticketing violates most airlines' contract of carriage. Someone doing it infrequently is unlikely, however, to be pursued by the airline, but some frequent fliers have reported either losing their frequent flier accounts or being threatened with such a loss. Experienced fliers recommend that if doing it more than very occasionally, passengers should not associate their frequent flier numbers with reservations using the hidden-city trick or should instead credit the miles to a partner airline. In 2014, United Airlines and Orbitz filed a lawsuit against Skiplagged, a flight search website focused on finding hidden-city tickets, alleging damages from lost revenues. The lawsuit was dismissed.

This technique may also be used on other forms of transport where the fare charged for a longer distance is not always greater than for a shorter distance. For example, in the National Rail network in Great Britain, it is possible to buy a cheaper ticket to a further destination where a traveler has no intention to travel to, and as long as the ticket permits a break of journey, end the journey short legally.

Back-to-back ticketing
Back-to-back ticketing is a type of nested ticketing whereby a traveler tries to circumvent minimum stay requirements. For example, a traveler may want to make two round trips midweek in two different weeks. At one time, airlines typically charged more for midweek round trips than for trips that involved a Saturday-night stay. The back-to-back ticketing ploy allows the traveler to book two round-trip tickets with Saturday stays even though the actual travel is all midweek. If a business traveler wanted to make two round trips from New York to Los Angeles in two consecutive weeks, instead of booking two round-trips in separate weeks in the following way:
 Ticket A outbound: week 1, Monday, New York to Los Angeles
 Ticket A return: week 1, Friday, Los Angeles to New York
 Ticket B outbound: week 2, Monday, New York to Los Angeles
 Ticket B return: week 2, Friday,  Los Angeles to New York
The traveler could rearrange the itinerary, nesting a round-trip home within the round-trip to Los Angeles such that the outbound trips on both tickets are in the first week and the return trips are on second week.
 Ticket A outbound: week 1, Monday, New York to Los Angeles
 Ticket B outbound: week 1, Friday, Los Angeles to New York
 Ticket B return: week 2, Monday, New York to Los Angeles
 Ticket A return: week 2, Friday, Los Angeles to New York
In such case, the traveler appears to stay at the destination on the weekend for both tickets (staying at Los Angeles for ticket A, and at New York for ticket B), thus taking advantage of the Saturday-night requirement for both tickets.

Within North America, the usefulness of the strategy has diminished materially, as most airlines have abandoned the discount for a Saturday-night stay-over for these types of trips. However, many intercontinental round-trip tickets still have minimum length of stay requirements. Back-to-back ticketing is useful with tickets if there is a minimum length of stay on the discount (such as 7 days), and the traveler needs to stay in the destination only for a shorter period of time.

This is in contrast to end-on-end ticketing where a traveller combines two different round trip fares, joining together at the connection point, onto a single ticket, for example, an A–B fare and a B–C fare issued on a single ticket allowing travel from A via B to C and back.

Legal status and consequences 
Airlines are strongly opposed to booking ploys for financial reasons. Other reasons cited by airlines include "public safety" concerns, but these are usually not explained. Many airlines have established means of identifying and penalizing travelers who take advantage of such tactics, most notably through their frequent flier programs.

Booking ploys are generally a breach of the contract of carriage between the passenger and the airline. Violating the contract is generally a civil matter. When a traveler is shown to have practiced such methods, airlines may respond by confiscating tickets, canceling frequent flier status (and possible confiscation of mileage), and billing travel agents for the fare difference. Airlines may also try to claim reimbursement from passengers, or even ban the passenger from flying with them.

In one case, Lufthansa filed a lawsuit against a passenger for hidden-city ticketing.

References

Further reading
 

Airline tickets